Utsunomiya Bunka Kaikan is a concert hall located in Utsunomiya, Tochigi Prefecture, Japan. It features a 2,000-seat great hall and a 500-seat small hall. It opened in 1979. Whitesnake performed at Utsunomiya Bunka Kaikan during their 1983 Japanese tour.

References

External links
Official Website

Concert halls in Japan